Mari Waraichan is a village in the Punjab province of Pakistan. It is located in the Gujrat District at 32 38' 37" north and 74 17' 55" east, near the bank of the river Chanab. Most of the population there are Jats. Most of the population earn their livelihood by land farming and dairy farming.

Populated places in Gujrat District